IWA may refer to:

Organizations

International
 International Water Association
 International Webmasters Association
 International Woodworkers of America, United States and Canada
 International Workers Association, an anarcho-syndicalist federation of labour unions 
 International Workingmen's Association (1864–1876), also known as the First International

United Kingdom
 Indian Workers' Association
 Inland Waterways Association, a canal charity
 Institute of Welsh Affairs, a policy think-tank

Elsewhere
 Independent Wrestling Association Mid-South, United States
 International Wrestling Alliance, Canada
 International Wrestling Association (disambiguation), various national bodies
 Irish Wheelchair Association, Ireland

Places
 Iwa, Nepal, a defunct municipality (village development committee)
 Phoenix-Mesa Gateway Airport, Mesa, Arizona, US (FAA code: IWA)

Other uses
 Great frigatebird, an avian species
 Hurricane Iwa, a late-1982 storm on the Hawaiian Islands
 IWA OutdoorClassics, an arms trade show held annually in Nuremberg, Germany
 Integrated Windows Authentication, Microsoft term for a set of protocols
 International Workshop Agreement, a stage of ISO's standardization process